Larry Smith Jr. (born December 4, 1974) is a former defensive tackle in the National Football League. He played for the Jacksonville Jaguars and the Green Bay Packers during his career. He attended Charlton County High school where he played with teammate Champ Bailey. They were both drafted in the NFL 1999.

External links
NFL.com player page

1974 births
Living people
People from Kingsland, Georgia
Players of American football from Georgia (U.S. state)
American football defensive tackles
Florida State Seminoles football players
Jacksonville Jaguars players
Green Bay Packers players
Valley Forge Military Academy Trojans football players